Chats Falls (in French: Chute des Chats, meaning "Cat Falls") were a set of waterfalls on the Ottawa River, near Fitzroy Harbour, Ontario, and Quyon, Quebec, Canada. A hydroelectric generating station is now located here, owned and operated jointly by Hydro-Québec and Ontario Power Generation. It lies within the cities of Ottawa, Ontario and Pontiac, Quebec.

History

Prior to the construction of the dam and power generating station, the Chats Falls was a waterfall with a 10.7 meter (35 feet) drop in the river, and consisted of a series of chutes running from what is now the eastern end of the dam all the way to the westernmost corner of Pontiac Bay. In their natural state the Chats Falls were a tourist attraction. In the years leading up to World War One it was fairly common to see large steam boats (paddle wheelers) heading up river with their decks full of sightseers.

In 1786, a homestead was built on what is known today as Indian Point on the northern end of Pontiac Bay. In 1800 this property was taken over by the XY Company, followed by the North West Company in 1804, and then the Hudson’s Bay Company in 1821, when these two companies merged. The HBC operated a small trading post, which closed in 1837.

Horse railway
In 1847, the Union Rail Road was established at Chats Falls. Passengers were treated to a horse-drawn railroad trip of  through the dense forest skirting the rough waters. While the roof sheltered passengers from rain and sun, the sides were open to mosquitoes, which brought complaints from many of the river travelers.

In 1853, James Poole, editor of The Carleton Place Herald, wrote about the Chats Falls horse railway:

Generating station

Construction on a run-of-river generating station and dam began in 1929 and was completed in 1932, destroying the falls and creating Lac des Chats reservoir behind the dam. The powerhouse is in the middle of the Ottawa River on the Ontario/Quebec border.

On March 2, 1953, a fire started in the morning, burning for 7 hours and destroying 2 generators and the building's roof. The station went completely down when the cables were damaged. Two of the eight generating units were brought back into operation the following day and another four units brought on-line the following week. In all, $2 million in damage was done.

The power station has 8 turbines (4 managed by Ontario Power Generation and 4 managed by Hydro-Québec) with a head of 16.16 meter (53 feet), generating a total of 79 MW.

See also 

List of crossings of the Ottawa River

References

External links
Ontario Power Generation - Chats Falls
Table of Hydro-Québec Hydroelectric Generating Stations (incl. Chutes des Chats generation station)

Landforms of Ottawa
National Capital Region (Canada)
Waterfalls of Ontario
Waterfalls of Quebec
Landforms of Outaouais